Shaolin Warrior (Orig. Po jie da shi) is a 1980 kung fu film directed by Lau Kar-wing. It is originally a Cantonese language film.

External links
 

1980 films
1980s Cantonese-language films
Hong Kong martial arts films
1980s Hong Kong films